Wolfgang Pfahl (23 June 1947 – 24 December 2021) was a German politician. A member of the Christian Democratic Union of Germany, he served in the Bürgerschaft of Bremen from 1997 to 2007. Pfahl died on 24 December 2021, at the age of 74.

References

1947 births
2021 deaths
20th-century German politicians
21st-century German politicians
Members of the Bürgerschaft of Bremen
Christian Democratic Union of Germany politicians
German politicians
People from Bremerhaven